The Baptist Union of North India (also known as BUNI) is a Baptist Christian denomination in India. It is affiliated with the Baptist World Alliance. The headquarters is in Delhi.

History
The Convention is officially founded in 1948.  According to a denomination census released in 2020, it claimed 54 churches and 15,700 members. 

BUNI runs several non profitable institutions, schools and charitable hospitals in North India.

References 

Baptist denominations in Asia
North India